Virginia Grey (March 22, 1917 – July 31, 2004) was an American actress who appeared in over 100 films and a number of radio and television shows from the 1930s to the early 1980s.

Biography
Grey was born on March 22, 1917, in Edendale, California, the youngest of three daughters of Florence Anna Grey (née Pauly; 1890—1930) and director Ray Grey. One of her early babysitters was movie star Gloria Swanson. Grey debuted at the age of 10 in the silent film Uncle Tom's Cabin (1927) as Little Eva. She continued acting for a few more years, but then left movies for three years to finish her education.

Grey gave up on training to be a nurse and returned to films in the 1930s with bit parts and work as an extra. She eventually signed a contract with Metro-Goldwyn-Mayer (MGM) and appeared in several films, including The Hardys Ride High (1939) with Mickey Rooney, Another Thin Man (1939) with William Powell, Hullabaloo (1940), and The Big Store (1941) with the Marx Brothers (Groucho, Harpo and Chico).

She left MGM in 1942, and worked steadily for several studios over subsequent years. During the 1950s and 1960s, producer Ross Hunter frequently included Grey in his popular soap melodramas such as All That Heaven Allows, Back Street and Madame X.

Grey had an on again/off again relationship with Clark Gable in the 1940s. After Gable's wife Carole Lombard died and he returned from military service, Gable and Grey were often seen at restaurants and nightclubs. Many, including Virginia herself, expected Gable to marry her, and tabloids often speculated on a wedding announcement. It was a great surprise when Gable hastily married Lady Sylvia Ashley in 1949, leaving Grey heartbroken. Gable divorced Ashley in 1952; however, he never rekindled his romance with Grey, and Grey's friends say that her hoping and waiting for Gable was the reason she never married.

Grey was a member of the Church of Jesus Christ of Latter-day Saints. She said: "I am a Mormon. Dad was, and I was, raised in that religion and during the '30s and '40s, I strayed and got into other things. I drank, I smoked, and did things totally opposite, not even thinking of what I had known during childhood. I remember in 1958, two elders came to my door and I began to think about my upbringing and what I learned, and then I started to meditate on that and I found solace once again and realized what I had been neglecting, if not forgetting, all those years when I was out of circulation. I returned to my Mormon roots around Christmastime that year and became very active in the church again. I'm glad those young men dropped in and reminded me about what I'd been missing because if not, I would've missed out on what the true 'big picture' is."

In 1951, Grey portrayed Blanche Bickerson on the syndicated comedy TV series The Bickersons. She was a regular on television in the 1950s and 1960s, appearing on Playhouse 90, U.S. Marshal, General Electric Theater, The DuPont Show with June Allyson, Your Show of Shows, Red Skelton, Wagon Train ("The Kate Parker Story", "The Major Adams Story"), Bonanza, Marcus Welby, M.D., Love, American Style, Burke's Law, The Virginian, Peter Gunn, Ironside and many others.

Grey died on July 31, 2004, age 87, in Woodland Hills, California, at The Motion Picture Home where she was a resident. She was cremated, and her ashes scattered at sea on August 6, 2004, off the Los Angeles coast.

She was portrayed by Anna Torv in the HBO mini-series The Pacific.

Filmography

References

Further reading

External links

1917 births
2004 deaths
American child actresses
American film actresses
American silent film actresses
American television actresses
American stage actresses
Actresses from Los Angeles
Metro-Goldwyn-Mayer contract players
20th-century American actresses
California Republicans
Latter Day Saints from California
21st-century American women
Goldwyn Girls